Le François 1st Canton Nord is a former canton in the Arrondissement of Le Marin on Martinique. It had 10,051 inhabitants (2012). It was disbanded in 2015. The canton comprised part of the commune of Le François.

References

Cantons of Martinique